Julien Mewis (born 8 April 1958) is a Belgian wrestler. He competed at the 1976 Summer Olympics and the 1980 Summer Olympics.

References

External links
 

1958 births
Living people
Belgian male sport wrestlers
Olympic wrestlers of Belgium
Wrestlers at the 1976 Summer Olympics
Wrestlers at the 1980 Summer Olympics
People from Brasschaat
Sportspeople from Antwerp Province
20th-century Belgian people